Place Vendôme Mall is a shopping mall on the Lusail, Qatar. It is a luxury mall built at a cost of $1.3bn, that was opened in 2022. It was built with inspiration from French architecture and includes many shops, restaurants and cafes. Some of the brands that Place Vendôme is hosting are, Burberry, Chloé, Gucci, Calvin Klein, Levi Strauss & Co., Tim Hortons, Aldo Group, Beverly Hills Polo Club, Louis Vuitton, United States Polo Association, Rituals, Monoprix, Nespresso, Miniso, Toys 4 Me, Maison Layan Café, Läderach, Tom Ford SA, Zara, Under Armour, Urban Outfitters, New Balance, Adidas, Massimo Dutti, Loro Piana, Alexander McQueen, Givenchy, Alfred Dunhill, H&M, Hermès, Fendi, Valentino, Only Roses, Armani, Vilebrequin, Anthropologie, Maison Royale, Amici Di Moda, Intimissimi, Prada, Fnac or Virgin Megastores. This complex has a 3D water fountain.

References

External links
 Place Vendôme Mall website

Shopping malls established in 2022
Shopping malls in Qatar